Germán Schulz (born February 5, 1994) is an Argentine rugby sevens player.

Schulz also represented Argentina at the 2022 Rugby World Cup Sevens in Cape Town.

References

External links 
 
 
 
 
 
 UAR Profile

1994 births
Living people
Argentine people of German descent
Male rugby sevens players
Argentine rugby union players
Olympic rugby sevens players of Argentina
Argentina international rugby sevens players
Rugby sevens players at the 2016 Summer Olympics
Sportspeople from Córdoba, Argentina
Pan American Games medalists in rugby sevens
Pan American Games gold medalists for Argentina
Rugby sevens players at the 2019 Pan American Games
Argentina international rugby union players
Medalists at the 2019 Pan American Games
Rugby sevens players at the 2020 Summer Olympics
Olympic medalists in rugby sevens
Medalists at the 2020 Summer Olympics
Olympic bronze medalists for Argentina